António Adriano Faria Lopes dos Santos (28 December 1919 – 11 May 2009) was a Portuguese army general and colonial administrator.

Biography
He held top military posts both before and after the 1974 Carnation Revolution. He was district governor of Portuguese Mozambique from 1959 until 1962. He was Governor of Macau from 17 April 1962 until July 1967, and chief of staff of Macau's garrison. He was appointed the Senior Assistant to the Portuguese Guinea Commander in Chief under Governor António de Spínola from 1968 until 1970. He was military commander in Portuguese Guinea between 1968 and 1970. He was governor of Cape Verde from 13 March 1969 until 1974.

Following the 25 April 1974 Carnation Revolution in Portugal, Antonio Lopes dos Santos became Deputy Army Chief of Staff of the Portuguese Army. He also became head of both the Military Studies Centre and the Military Disciplinary High Council. Lopes dos Santos last official appointment was as the director of the Portuguese National Defense Institute. He remained involved in relations between Macau and Portugal, and was the president of the Jorge Álvares Foundation (Fundação Jorge Álvares) from 2000 until his death in 2009. He also served as the head of the Portugal-China Friendship Association (AAPC).

References

1919 births
2009 deaths
Governors of Macau
Portuguese generals
Colonial heads of Cape Verde
Colonial people in Angola
Colonial people in Mozambique